Albert Charles "Curly" Linton (5 September 1895 – 25 July 1985) was an Anzac veteran and Australian rules footballer who played with North Melbourne in the Victorian Football League (VFL).

A brilliant centreman, he was voted "most popular player" at the club for the 1924 season. Linton was a private in the 31st Infantry Battalion, 5th Division AIF and was twice wounded, once during the Battle of Fromelles and again during the fighting at Polygon Wood during the Third Battle of Ypres.

Notes

External links 

1895 births
1985 deaths
Australian rules footballers from Melbourne
North Melbourne Football Club players
Australian rules footballers from Tasmania
Australian military personnel of World War I
Essendon Association Football Club players
Military personnel from Tasmania
People from Footscray, Victoria